Busman's Holiday is a British television game show produced by Granada for the ITV network from 26 February 1985 to 28 June 1993. Its hosts over the years were Julian Pettifer (1985–88), Sarah Kennedy (1989–91) and Elton Welsby (1993). Charles Foster was the announcer.

Title
The phrase "busman's holiday" is defined in the Oxford English Dictionary as a period of holiday or leisure time spent doing something similar to one's normal occupation, first shown to be used in 1893.

Format
Contestants were divided into competing teams of three based upon career, at first three teams and later in the series just two teams. They were dressed in their regular work clothes. The winning team went on an exotic holiday where they had to work, to learn how their jobs were performed in other locations.

The format of the programme consisted of multiple rounds of quizzing: world geography, questions of the other's profession or brain teasers, questions of their own profession—sometimes quite embarrassing, and questions on a final destination—revealing which team had conducted the best research prior to the match. There was also a review of the prior week's winning contestants' holiday.

Transmissions

References

External links
 
 Busman's Holiday at BFI
 

1980s British game shows
1990s British game shows
1985 British television series debuts
1993 British television series endings
ITV game shows
Television series by ITV Studios
Television shows produced by Granada Television
English-language television shows